Penthimia is a genus of leafhoppers belonging to the family Cicadellidae subfamily Deltocephalinae.

Species
These 97 species belong to the genus Penthimia:

 Penthimia albiguttula Stål 1870 c g
 Penthimia albipennis Linnavuori 1977 c g
 Penthimia alboguttata Kuoh c g
 Penthimia americana Fitch, 1851 c g b
 Penthimia apicata Bierman 1910 c g
 Penthimia arcuata Cai & Shen 1998 c g
 Penthimia aridula Linnavuori 1977 c g
 Penthimia atomaria Walker 1870 c g
 Penthimia attenuata Distant 1918 c g
 Penthimia badia Distant 1918 c g
 Penthimia bos Linnavuori 1977 c g
 Penthimia caliginosa Walker 1870 c g
 Penthimia castanaica Jacobi 1944 c g
 Penthimia citrina Wang c g
 Penthimia compacta Walker 1851 c g
 Penthimia curvata Shobharani, Viraktamath & Webb, 2018 g
 Penthimia densa Kuoh c g
 Penthimia distanti Baker 1924 c g
 Penthimia dorsimaculata Kwon & Lee 1978 c g
 Penthimia erebus Distant 1908 c g
 Penthimia escalerae Distant 1910 c g
 Penthimia euterpe Linnavuori 1977 c g
 Penthimia flavinotum Matsumura 1912 c g
 Penthimia flavitarsis Melichar 1914 c g
 Penthimia flavocapitata Distant 1918 c g
 Penthimia floridana Lawson, 1933 c g b
 Penthimia formosa Yang, C. c g
 Penthimia formosana Matsumura 1912 c g
 Penthimia fraterna Distant 1918 c g
 Penthimia fulviguttata Cheng & Li 2003 c g
 Penthimia fumosa Kuoh c g
 Penthimia funebris Distant 1918 c g
 Penthimia funerea Linnavuori 1977 c g
 Penthimia fuscomaculosa Kwon & Lee 1978 c g
 Penthimia guttula Matsumura 1912 c g
 Penthimia hemifuscata Merino 1936 c g
 Penthimia iris Bierman 1910 c g
 Penthimia irrorata Horváth 1909 c g
 Penthimia juno Distant 1908 c g
 Penthimia laetifica Dlabola 1958 c g
 Penthimia laevicollis Linnavuori 1977 c g
 Penthimia lenkoranea Dlabola 1961 c g
 Penthimia likimica Linnavuori 1977 c g
 Penthimia lurida Walker 1870 c g
 Penthimia maculipennis Spinola 1852 c g
 Penthimia maculosa Shobharani, Viraktamath & Webb, 2018 g
 Penthimia majuscula Distant 1918 c g
 Penthimia maolanensis Cheng & Li 2003 c g
 Penthimia meghalayensis Shobharani, Viraktamath & Webb, 2018 g
 Penthimia melanocephala Motschulsky 1863 c g
 Penthimia minuta Linnavuori 1977 c g
 Penthimia montana Distant 1918 c g
 Penthimia mudonensis Distant 1912 c g
 Penthimia nana Kusnezov 1931 c g
 Penthimia neoattenuata Shobharani, Viraktamath & Webb, 2018 g
 Penthimia nigella Linnavuori 1977 c g
 Penthimia nigerrima Jacobi 1944 c g
 Penthimia nigra Goeze 1778 c g
 Penthimia nigropicea Motschulsky 1863 c g
 Penthimia nigroscutellata Cai & Shen 1998 c g
 Penthimia nilgiriensis Distant 1918 c g
 Penthimia nitens Linnavuori 1977 c g
 Penthimia nitida Lethierry 1876 c g
 Penthimia noctua Distant 1918 c g
 Penthimia okinawana Hayashi & Machida 1996 c g
 Penthimia persephone Linnavuori 1977 c g
 Penthimia picta b
 Penthimia pluto Linnavuori 1977 c g
 Penthimia proxima Logvinenko 1983 c g
 Penthimia puncticollis Linnavuori 1977 c g
 Penthimia quadrinotata Distant 1918 c g
 Penthimia raniformis Walker 1870 c g
 Penthimia rawasi Bierman 1910 c g
 Penthimia rhadamantha Linnavuori 1977 c g
 Penthimia ribhoi Shobharani, Viraktamath & Webb, 2018 g
 Penthimia rubramaculata Kuoh c g
 Penthimia rubrostriata Kuoh c g
 Penthimia rufopunctata g
 Penthimia sahyadrica Shobharani, Viraktamath & Webb, 2018 g
 Penthimia scapularis Distant 1908 c g
 Penthimia scutellata Melichar 1902 c g
 Penthimia sincipitalis Hayashi & Machida 1996 c g
 Penthimia spiculata Shobharani, Viraktamath & Webb, 2018 g
 Penthimia subniger Distant 1908 c g
 Penthimia testacea Kuoh 1991 c g
 Penthimia testudinea Evans 1955 c g
 Penthimia theae Matsumura, 1912 g
 Penthimia trimaculata Motschulsky 1863 c g
 Penthimia tumida Shobharani, Viraktamath & Webb, 2018 g
 Penthimia undata Cai & Shen 1998 c g
 Penthimia variabilis Distant 1918 c g
 Penthimia variolosa Walker 1870 c g
 Penthimia vicaria b
 Penthimia vinula c g
 Penthimia vittatifrons Distant 1918 c g
 Penthimia yunnana Kuoh c g
 Penthimia zampa Distant 1910 c g

Data sources: i = ITIS, c = Catalogue of Life, g = GBIF, b = Bugguide.net

References

External links

 Fauna Europaea
 Biolib

Penthimiini
Cicadellidae genera